Miranda Yates-Steg (born 8 December 1963) is an Australian former professional tennis player.

Active in the 1980s, Yates is a native of Melbourne and was one of Australia's top junior players, earning a position on the AIS program. She won the 1980 Australian Open girls' doubles title. In 1981 she was ranked behind only Anne Minter and Liz Sayers of the Australian players in the ITF junior singles rankings.

Yates, who played in qualifiers at Wimbledon, made the women's singles main draw of the 1980 Australian Open, where she lost her first round match to Nanette Schutte in three sets. She competed on tour in mostly satellite tournaments, before retiring and raising a family in Munich with her German husband.

References

External links
 
 

1963 births
Living people
Australian female tennis players
Australian Open (tennis) junior champions
Grand Slam (tennis) champions in girls' doubles
Tennis players from Melbourne
Australian Institute of Sport tennis players
Australian emigrants to Germany
20th-century Australian women
Australian expatriate sportspeople in Germany